"If You Want My Love" is a song recorded by the Dutch band Twenty 4 Seven. It was the tenth single and the sixth song to be taken from the fourth album, Twenty 4 Hours A Day, Seven Days A Week. The song remained a constant area of success only in the Netherlands, the single reached 77 on the (Single Top 100). It did not chart in the United Kingdom. "If You Want My Love" was postponed a couple of times, because "We Are the World" did successfully well in many other countries, like Spain where it went top 10.

Charts

References

1997 singles
1997 songs
Twenty 4 Seven songs
Happy hardcore songs
CNR Music singles
Songs written by Ruud van Rijen